Benevenuto Martins Nuñes (born 27 June 1913, date of death unknown) was an Olympic freestyle and backstroke swimmer from Brazil, who participated at two Summer Olympics for his native country. At the 1932 Summer Olympics in Los Angeles, he swam the 4×200-metre freestyle, finishing 7th in the final, along with Manuel Silva, Isaac Moraes and Manoel Villar. He also swam the 100-metre backstroke, not reaching the finals. At the 1936 Summer Olympics in Berlin, he swam the 100-metre backstroke, not reaching the finals.

References

External links 
 

1913 births
Year of death missing
Brazilian male backstroke swimmers
Brazilian male freestyle swimmers
Olympic swimmers of Brazil
Swimmers at the 1932 Summer Olympics
Swimmers at the 1936 Summer Olympics
20th-century Brazilian people